Swinfen and Packington is a civil parish in Lichfield District, Staffordshire, England. The parish was newly formed in 1934 by division from Weeford. The parish includes the hamlet of Swinfen, and contains several listed buildings, including Packington Hall.

See also
Listed buildings in Swinfen and Packington

References

Civil parishes in Staffordshire